The Court–Cowan Ministry was the 32nd Ministry of the Government of Western Australia, and was led by Liberal Premier Richard Court and his deputy, the Nationals' Hendy Cowan. It succeeded the Lawrence Ministry on 16 February 1993, following the defeat of the Labor government at the 1993 election ten days earlier. The Ministry was reconstituted on 9 January 1997 following the December 1996 election, due in part to the retirement and resignation of several ministers—Richard Lewis, Kevin Minson, Roger Nicholls and Bob Wiese. The ministry was followed by the Gallop Ministry on 16 February 2001 after the Coalition lost government at the state election held on 16 February.

First Ministry
On 16 February 1993, the Governor, Sir Francis Burt, designated 17 principal executive offices of the Government under section 43(2) of the Constitution Acts Amendment Act 1899. The following ministers were then appointed to the positions, and served until the reconstitution of the Ministry on 10 February 1995.

The list below is ordered by decreasing seniority within the Cabinet, as indicated by the Government Gazette and the Hansard index. Blue entries indicate members of the Liberal Party, whilst green entries indicate members of the National Party.

 Both the First and Second Ministries were officially referred to as the "Court–Cowan Ministry" or "Court Ministry" in Hansard and other parliamentary records.
 On 24 August 1993, Doug Shave resigned for personal reasons. His three portfolios were distributed to three of the other ministers.
 On 25 January 1994, the ministry returned to 17 members with the appointment of Kevin Prince. Additionally, the Premier took on the role of Minister for Tourism.
 On 26 April 1994, parliamentary secretary Bob Pike died. His parliamentary secretary position was not refilled.

First Ministry (reconstituted)
A reshuffle on 10 February 1995 saw several changes in order and portfolios, but no changes of personnel. The Governor, Major-General Michael Jeffery, designated 17 principal executive offices of the Government under section 43(2) of the Constitution Acts Amendment Act 1899. The following ministers were then appointed to the positions, and served until the reconstitution of the Ministry on 9 January 1997.

Blue entries indicate members of the Liberal Party, whilst green entries indicate members of the National Party.

 On 21 December 1995, a major reshuffle took place amongst existing Ministers, mainly to discharge particular Ministers of portfolios which had proven troublesome for the government.
 On 26 April 1996, George Cash resigned from the ministry due to ill health. Graham Kierath and Kevin Minson adopted his portfolios, whilst Norman Moore was elected leader of the Government in the Legislative Council four days later.

Second Ministry
On 9 January 1997, the Governor, Major General Michael Jeffery, designated 17 principal executive offices of the Government under section 43(2) of the Constitution Acts Amendment Act 1899. The following ministers were then appointed to the positions, and served until the reconstitution of the Ministry on 22 December 1999.

 On 28 July 1998, a reshuffle took place following Eric Charlton's departure from Parliament, with Agricultural MLC Murray Criddle assuming his Transport portfolio. Graham Kierath lost his Labour Relations portfolio to Cheryl Edwardes, whilst Kevin Prince and John Day traded portfolios.

Second Ministry (reconstituted)
On 22 December 1999, following a reshuffle which lost Ministers Max Evans and Rhonda Parker, the Governor, Major General Michael Jeffery, designated 17 principal executive offices of the Government under section 43(2) of the Constitution Acts Amendment Act 1899. The following ministers were then appointed to the positions, and served until the end of the Ministry on 16 February 2001, when they were replaced by the Gallop Ministry.

References
 Hansard Indexes for 1993–2000, "Legislature of Western Australia"
 
 
 
 
 
 
 

Court 2
Ministries of Elizabeth II